The Anacanthobatidae, the smooth skates or leg skates, are a family of skates found at depths below  in the Indian, Pacific and Atlantic Oceans.

They lack the dorsal denticles (sharp, tooth-like scales) of other rays, hence their name, from Greek an- meaning "without", acantha meaning "thorn", and bathys meaning "deep".

They are bottom-dwelling fishes found on the continental slopes of tropical and subtropical waters.

References

Anacanthobatidae